Carneys Point is an unincorporated community and census-designated place (CDP) located within Carneys Point Township, in Salem County, New Jersey, United States. As of the 2010 United States Census, the CDP's population was 7,382.

Settled in 1727 by Irish immigrants, of which included Thomas Carney.  After World War I broke out and the E.I. du Pont de Nemours plants in the area expanded, a village was constructed for the employees of the plants.  This village was named after Thomas Carney.

Geography
According to the United States Census Bureau, Carneys Point had a total area of 8.771 square miles (22.715 km2), including 8.332 square miles (21.579 km2) of land and 0.439 square miles (1.136 km2) of water (5.00%).

Demographics

Census 2010

Census 2000
As of the 2000 United States Census there were 6,914 people, 2,829 households, and 1,841 families living in the town. The population density was 305.1/km2 (790.4/mi2). There were 3,017 housing units at an average density of 133.1/km2 (344.9/mi2). The racial makeup of the town was 77.03% White, 17.57% African American, 0.29% Native American, 0.87% Asian, 0.04% Pacific Islander, 2.21% from other races, and 1.98% from two or more races. 4.15% of the population were Hispanic or Latino of any race.

There were 2,829 households, out of which 28.4% had children under the age of 18 living with them, 47.3% were married couples living together, 13.6% had a female householder with no husband present, and 34.9% were non-families. 30.2% of all households were made up of individuals, and 12.4% had someone living alone who was 65 years of age or older. The average household size was 2.40 and the average family size was 2.98.

In the CDP the population was spread out, with 23.0% under the age of 18, 8.5% from 18 to 24, 28.4% from 25 to 44, 23.9% from 45 to 64, and 16.2% who were 65 years of age or older. The median age was 38 years. For every 100 females, there were 90.7 males. For every 100 females age 18 and over, there were 86.5 males.

The median income for a household in the CDP was $39,976, and the median income for a family was $51,270. Males had a median income of $40,195 versus $26,620 for females. The per capita income for the CDP was $19,208. 11.8% of the population and 9.3% of families were below the poverty line. Out of the total people living in poverty, 13.4% are under the age of 18 and 10.2% are 65 or older.

References

Carneys Point Township, New Jersey
Census-designated places in Salem County, New Jersey